Safe Horizon, formerly the Victim Services Agency, is the largest victim services nonprofit organization in the United States, providing social services for victims of abuse and violent crime. Operating at 57 locations throughout the five boroughs of New York City. Safe Horizon provides social services to over 250,000 victims of violent crime and abuse and their families per year. It has over 800 employees, and has programs for victims of domestic violence, child abuse, sexual assault, and human trafficking, as well as homeless youth and the families of homicide victims. Safe Horizon's website has been accessible for the Spanish-speaking population since 2012. Safe Horizon has an annual budget of over $63 million.

History 
In 1975, a pilot program began in New York City's court system that addressed the need to assist criminal court witnesses who had been intimidated or who felt too threatened to testify in court. Three years later, that pilot program became the Victim Services Agency, officially incorporated May 26, 1978, and offering a broader array of services that helped more victims of crime and abuse. Lucy N. Friedman was Safe Horizon's founding executive director. By 1981, the Victim Services Agency provided programs for victims of domestic violence, offering them shelter, counseling, and concrete support. Over the next three decades, the Victim Services Agency began various other programs to assist victims and their families during times of crisis. In 2000, the Victim Services Agency became Safe Horizon.

Today, Safe Horizon is the largest organization helping victims of crime and abuse in the United States, helping more than 250,000 children, adults, and families each year. Since 2008, Safe Horizon has been under the leadership of Chief Executive Officer Ariel Zwang. Stephanie March has served as a member of Safe Horizon's Board.

Mission 
Safe Horizon's stated mission is to provide support, prevent violence and promote justice for victims of crime and abuse, their families, and communities

Hotlines 
Safe Horizon operates four hotlines: a 24-hour Domestic Violence Hotline; a Crime Victims Hotline; a Rape, Sexual Assault, and Incest Hotline; and a Centralized Helpline. These hotlines are multilingual, with over 150 languages available.

Domestic violence services 
Safe Horizon helps tens of thousands of domestic violence survivors every year, through hotlines, court programs, community offices, and shelters. Safe Horizon is the U.S.'s largest operator of domestic violence shelters, with nine shelters located throughout the five boroughs of New York City. A domestic violence shelter was named in honor of Safe Horizon Board Member Steven C. Parrish in 2008.

Child advocacy centers 
In 1996, Safe Horizon opened the United States's first fully co-located Child Advocacy Center.

Safe Horizon is the U.S.'s largest operator of child advocacy centers in an urban setting, with five fully accredited Child Advocacy Centers, located in Manhattan, Brooklyn, Staten Island, Queens and the Bronx.

Safe Horizon has helped victimized children overcome the trauma of abuse, partnering with the Yale Child Study Center on a new treatment, the Child and Family Traumatic Stress Intervention (CFTSI). CFTSI, a short-term therapy treatment that involves the participation of the non-offending caregiver, has been found to remarkably reduce the trauma symptoms of abused children.

Anti-trafficking program 
Safe Horizon's Anti-Trafficking Program (ATP) meets practical needs for victims of human trafficking, such as food, clothing, and shelter, as well as legal assistance. ATP was established in 2001 and has helped clients and provided intelligence to authorities allowing law enforcement to locate traffickers since its very beginnings. Florrie R. Burke helped to found ATP.

ATP has represented the victims in several high-profile cases in recent years, including María Ríos Fun and Sangeeta Richard 

ATP is supported by the federal Office of Justice's Office for Victims of Crime. Safe Horizon is a member of Global Alliance Against Traffic in Women.

Streetwork Project 
Safe Horizon's Streetwork Project provides homeless youth with food, clothing, shower and laundry facilities, HIV testing, counseling, emergency shelter and more. Staff work with clients towards long-term housing solutions and treatment for medical and mental health problems. Ali Forney was a client of Safe Horizon's Streetwork Project.

Community programs 
Safe Horizon operates four Community Program offices, in Brooklyn, Queens, Staten Island, and Manhattan (which also serves the Bronx).

Counseling center 
Safe Horizon's Counseling Center is an out-patient mental health clinic focused specifically on treating survivors of trauma. It is the only New York State-licensed mental health clinic specializing exclusively in treating traumatized victims of crime and abuse.

Law projects 
In addition to ATP's legal work for victims of human trafficking, Safe Horizon's Domestic Violence Law Project (DVLP) and Immigration Law Project (ILP) provide low-cost and free legal aid for victims of domestic violence and immigrant victims of abuse or torture.

Since its inception, DVLP has provided legal advocacy and representation to thousands of low-income victims of domestic violence in family justice proceedings such for orders of protection, custody, support, and divorce proceedings. DVLP also advocates for clients within the criminal justice system.

Project Safe 
Safe Horizon's Project Safe provides free lock changes to victims of crime who have reason to believe the perpetrators may have access to their homes. In most cases, lock changes are available within 24 to 48 hours.

9/11 disaster relief 
From September 11, 2001, through June 2008, Safe Horizon provided disaster relief to the victims of 9/11 and their families through the Family Assistance Center. As one of the largest charities assisting victims, Safe Horizon provided counseling to hundreds of thousands of those affected, and hundreds of millions in relief dollars.

References

Non-profit organizations based in New York City
Organizations established in 1978
Domestic violence-related organizations in the United States
Child abuse-related organizations
Organizations that combat human trafficking
Homeless shelters in the United States
Women's shelters in the United States
Charities based in New York City
Violence against women in the United States
Human trafficking in the United States
1978 establishments in New York City
Women in New York City